The Poultry Club of Great Britain is a registered charity founded in 1877.  Its stated purpose is to "safeguard the interests of all pure and traditional breeds of poultry including chickens, bantams, ducks, geese and turkeys".

The club maintains the British Poultry Standard and acts as the overseeing body for all poultry breed clubs in Great Britain and Northern Ireland. It is also responsible for organizing the annual National Poultry Show.

The club donated to The Museum of English Rural Life David Scrivener's collection of printed materials related to the breeding and keeping of poultry.

See also
 American Poultry Association
 Rare Poultry Society

References

Organizations established in 1877
Poultry fancy organizations
Breeder organizations
1877 establishments in the United Kingdom
Animal charities based in the United Kingdom
Charities based in Tyne and Wear